The Attert is a river flowing through Belgium and Luxembourg, left tributary of the Alzette. Its source is in Nobressart, north-west of Arlon, in the Belgian province Luxembourg. It flows into the river Alzette at Colmar-Berg. It flows through the village of Attert in Belgium, and the towns of  Redange, Useldange, Boevange-sur-Attert, and Bissen in Luxembourg.

International rivers of Europe
Rivers of the Ardennes (Belgium)
Rivers of the Ardennes (Luxembourg)
Rivers of Luxembourg
Rivers of Belgium
Rivers of Luxembourg (Belgium)
Attert

no:Attert